Guards units were elite units and formations in the Soviet Armed Forces that continue to exist in the Russian Armed Forces and other post-Soviet states. These units were awarded Guards status after distinguishing themselves in wartime service, and are considered to have elite status. The Guards designation originated during World War II, its name coming both from the Russian Imperial Guard, and the old Bolshevik Red Guards.

History

The title of Guards within the Soviet Armed Forces was first introduced on 18 September 1941, at the direction of the Headquarters of the Supreme High Command (Stavka). By order No. 308 of the People's Commissar of Defence, the 100th, 127th, 153rd and 161st Rifle Divisions were renamed the 1st, 2nd, 3rd and 4th Guards Rifle Divisions, respectively, for their distinguished service during the 1941 Yelnya Offensive. The Soviet 316th Rifle Division was renamed the 8th Guards Rifle Division on 18 November 1941, following the actions of the Panfilovtsy and was given the Panfilovskaya title in honor of its late commander Ivan Panfilov. By the end of 1941, the 107th, 120th, 64th, 316th, 78th, and 52nd Rifle Divisions had become the 5th through 10th Guards Rifle Divisions. By the end of the war, over 4,500 units, formations, and ships had received the Guards designation, including eleven field armies, six tank armies, 40 rifle corps, and 117 rifle divisions. However, not all Guards units received their status through combat: all artillery units equipped with Katyusha multiple rocket launchers were designated Guards Mortar units upon formation.  Airborne units, already considered elite, were also formed as Guards rather than receiving the status through combat action. Some twenty Guards Airborne Brigades were converted into the 11th–16th Guards Rifle Divisions in December 1943.

The units and formations awarded the Soviet Guard title received special Guards colours in accordance with the decision of the Presidium of the Supreme Soviet of the USSR. On May 21, 1942, the Presidium of the Supreme Soviet of the USSR introduced Guards ranks, which allowed soldiers of Guards units to append the title to their ranks, for example a major in a Guards unit could be referred to as Guards Major and any soldier could be a Guardsman (Gvardeyets) rather than a just a Red Army man (Krasnoarmeyets). The decree also introduced Guards badges to be worn of the right side of the chest in all uniforms to distinguish those in Guards units from others. In June 1943, the Presidum resolved to officially introduce to the Red Army, Air Force and NKVD's Police, Internal Troops and Border Guards the Guards Red Banners (regimental colours) and in February 1944 the Guards Red Banners for the Soviet Navy (including naval infantry and Aviation) for those Guards units decorated with the Order of the Red Banner.

If any warrior was in Battle of Stalingrad personal Guards title is appended automatically without any formal criteria (even he or she is not awarded or promoted in campaign)

Guards status was more than just a decoration and had practical benefits for those in such units: enlisted personnel in Guards units received double pay compared to those in other units, and non-commissioned officers and above received 1.5 times the pay of their counterparts in other units. Such rewards of Guards status meant that it often acted as a morale booster and increased unit cohesion, with soldiers writing letters home about being awarded the status. Guards status also resulted in higher priority for replacements and equipment than normal units, although they were still often understrength by 1944 due to high casualty rates. From March 1942, Guards rifle divisions were organized along a different table of organization and equipment from standard rifle divisions that increased their allocation of personnel, artillery and infantry support weapons. The Guards rifle divisions received an organic SU-76 assault gun battalion to replace their towed anti-tank gun unit in December 1944, which standard rifle divisions did not include until after the end of the war. While normal rifle divisions would become seriously understrength as the war progressed and the manpower pool of infantry conscripts declined, efforts were made to keep Guards rifle divisions at higher strength: the guards rifle division was authorized 10,670 soldiers compared to the 9,435 of its normal counterpart. On a wider scale, such benefits of Guards status were reflected in the field armies designated Guards, which were assigned one or two tank or mechanized corps to conduct encirclements of German defenders after their success in the Battle of Stalingrad. The Guards armies tended to have proportionally more artillery and tanks assigned than normal field armies. After the end of the war, the Guards armies that had taken major roles in the final defeat of Germany and the Battle of Berlin were rewarded by being chosen as the units to garrison the Soviet occupation zone of Germany; they would later become the core of the Group of Soviet Forces in Germany that confronted the NATO forces stationed in West Germany during the Cold War.

Since the break-up of the Soviet Union, Guards designations for military units have been retained by Belarus, Russia, Kazakhstan and Kyrgyzstan. Ukraine retained the Guards designations until 2016. The 22nd Separate Guards Spetsnaz Brigade became the first Russian Armed Forces unit to be awarded the title in 2001, for its performance during the Second Chechen War. In subsequent years, more Russian units received the title, including several during the 2022 Russian invasion of Ukraine.

Conceptually different, a number of former Soviet republics have "national guard" branches of their armed forces, including Armenia, Azerbaijan, Georgia, Kazakhstan (2,500 Republican Guards in 1994), Tajikistan, Turkmenistan, Ukraine and Uzbekistan.

Badges

See also 
 List of Soviet divisions 1917–1945 has an almost complete list of Soviet Guards divisions.
 List of army units called Guards
 List of guards units of Russia
 List of guards units of Ukraine
 Russian Guards

Notes

References 
 David Glantz (2005). Colossus Reborn: The Red Army at War 1941–43. University Press of Kansas. .
 
 Richard Overy (1997). Russia's War: A History of the Soviet Effort: 1941–1945. New York: Penguin Books. .
 
 Steven J. Zaloga and James Grandsen (1984). Soviet Tanks and Combat Vehicles of World War Two. London: Arms and Armour Press. .

External links 
 Red Army Guards, from the U.S. Military Intelligence Bulletin, March 1946

Honorary titles
Military units and formations of Belarus
Military units and formations of Russia
Military units and formations of the Soviet Union
Military units and formations of Ukraine